Jean Eudes Demaret (born 25 July 1984, in Senlis) is a French triathlete, and former road racing cyclist, who rode for , between 2008 and 2012.

Palmares

2000
 2nd, National U17 Cyclo-Cross Championship
2006
 1st, Prologue & stage 8, Tour de la Guadeloupe
2007
 1st, Prologue, Circuit de Saône-et-Loire
 1st, Stage 5, Tour du Poitou-Charentes
2011
 1st, Tartu GP

References

External links

French male cyclists
Tour de Guadeloupe stage winners
1984 births
Living people
People from Senlis
Sportspeople from Oise
Cyclists from Hauts-de-France
French male triathletes
21st-century French people
20th-century French people